The Halifax-Dartmouth Bridge Commission, operating as Halifax Harbour Bridges, is a Nova Scotia Crown corporation created in 1950 by provincial statute. It currently operates under a new statute passed in 2005 named the Halifax-Dartmouth Bridge Commission Act. The commission is responsible for constructing, operating, and maintaining two suspension bridges that cross Halifax Harbour between the communities of Halifax and Dartmouth. The commission also maintains authority over any other bridge or tunnel structures crossing the harbour limits, including the Northwest Arm, although no such bridge or tunnel currently exists.

In March 2009, the commission launched its current operating name, Halifax Harbour Bridges, as well as an updated logo.  The Commission reports to the Minister of Finance and the Nova Scotia Cabinet approves the Commission's financing. The commission has nine board members, five of whom are appointed by the provincial government, including the chair and vice-chair; the Halifax Regional Municipality appoints four councillors to the remaining seats on the board. The commission's toll rates are approved by the Nova Scotia Utility and Review Board.

Bridges

Angus L. Macdonald Bridge

The Angus L. Macdonald Bridge, known locally as the Macdonald Bridge or the "old bridge", was opened on April 2, 1955. The bridge was designed by Phillip Pratley, a bridge designer also responsible for the Lions Gate Bridge in Vancouver. The Macdonald Bridge often suffered from traffic problems due to its narrow width, so a lane addition project was completed in 1999, relocating the pedestrian and bicycle outboard of the main cables. From 2015–2017, the bridge structure suspended below the main cables was completely replaced, including the floor beams, stiffening trusses, road deck and suspender ropes. The only original components are the main cable, the two towers, the anchor piers and cable bents. It is only the second time ever that the suspended spans of a bridge have been replaced while being open for traffic during the day; the first being the similar Lions Gate Bridge in Vancouver.

A. Murray MacKay Bridge

The A. Murray MacKay Bridge, known locally as the MacKay Bridge or the "new bridge", was opened on July 10, 1970. It is located to the north of the Macdonald Bridge, at the Narrows of Halifax Harbour. The bridge feeds into Highway 111, the Circumferential Highway. Because of vehicle weight limits, the MacKay Bridge is the only crossing that commercial trucks can use to cross the harbour.

On an average work day there are about 104,000 crossings on both bridges.

In early 2021 the private entity responsible for the tolling and maintenance of the bridge declared that another mega project is on the horizon after the completion of the MacDonald bridge redecking.

The two options presented was to either repair the four lane bridge, or build a new six lane bridge with walkways alongside the old before tearing down the original.

Proposed third harbour crossing
In February 2008, consultants McCormick Rankin Corporation of Halifax released a report on the need for a third harbour crossing, commissioned by the HDBC.  The report shows that cross-harbour traffic is nearing the capacity of the existing two bridges, and concluded that a third harbour crossing would be required by 2016–2026.  The report suggested either a six-lane bridge, costing $1.1 billion, or a four-lane tunnel, costing $1.4 billion, from the southern terminus of the Circumferential Highway to the CN Rail cut on peninsular Halifax.  The bridge option would allow for two dedicated lanes for bus rapid transit (BRT), in keeping with HRM's regional planning goal of increasing public transit use.

The report listed several options for a third harbour crossing, including twinning of the MacKay bridge, a bridge across the Northwest Arm, and several BRT only tunnels under the harbour, however, the Woodside crossing was determined to be the most beneficial.

Initial talks were held in July 2006 with officials at the Halifax Regional Municipality for construction of a third bridge or tunnel across Halifax Harbour which lead the HDBC to commission a needs assessment study.

The subject of a third harbour bridge has come up several times in recent decades.  The idea for a crossing from Woodside to Halifax was originally envisioned by traffic engineers in the 1950s and 1960s as part of a larger regional transportation system  connecting the Circumferential Highway, Bicentennial Drive, and the cancelled Harbour Drive.

Toll collection
In May 2008 the HDBC introduced axle-based tolling on both the MacKay and Macdonald bridges.  This system replaced the old weight-based tolling system that was used since the opening of the Macdonald bridge in 1955.  The switch to axle-based tolling put the HDBC in line with most other toll facilities in North America, making it easier for them to maintain their electronic toll collection system, MACPASS.

As of April 1, 2011 the toll for a regular passenger vehicle is $1.00 when paid by cash, or $0.80 when paid electronically with a MACPASS transponder.  Prior to May 1, 2008, bridge users could also use bridge tokens, at a cost of $0.60 each. The original toll, when the Macdonald opened in 1955, was 40 cents plus 5
cents per passenger. There was also a separate toll for trucks, 
cyclists, pedestrians, motorcycles and horses/rider.

MACPASS was introduced in 1998 to speed up toll collection and provide a more convenient payment method for bridge users.  The MACPASS was such a success that on July 25, 2006 the HDBC announced they were phasing out the use of tokens to reduce idle times at the toll plaza and ensure the capacity of the bridges was not lessened by toll plaza congestion.  When the announcement was made, 55% of tolls were already being paid electronically with MACPASS.  It is believed that if this number can be increased, greenhouse gas emissions could be reduced due to reduced idle times at the toll plaza, and help alleviate the immediate need for a third harbour crossing by ensuring the full capacity of the existing bridges is utilized.

The HDBC stopped selling tokens on April 1, 2008 and stopped accepting tokens on May 1, 2008.  Initially bridge users paid a $30 deposit for a MACPASS; this was refunded when the token was phased out and users can now get a transponder free of charge.

The MACPASS transponder is the same device used on other nearby toll facilities, such as the Cobequid Pass, the toll section of Highway 104, and the Confederation Bridge.  It is therefore not required to purchase a separate transponder for each service.

The MACPASS and integrated MACPASS Plus transponders are also set up in cooperation with the Halifax International Airport to work as a payment method at the airport's new pay per use parking facility.

As a user-pay operation that is self-funding, the Commission receives no assistance from, nor are its loans guaranteed by any level of government.

References

External links
 Halifax-Dartmouth Bridge Commission
 Halifax-Dartmouth Bridge Commission Act
 Newspaper article on both bridges (page H9)

1950 establishments in Nova Scotia
Crown corporations of Nova Scotia
Electronic toll collection
Transport in Halifax, Nova Scotia
Nova Scotia government departments and agencies